"Hard to Handle" is a 1968 song written by American soul singer Otis Redding along with Al Bell and Allen Jones. Originally recorded by Redding, it was released in 1968 as the B-side to "Amen" (shortly after the singer's sudden death in 1967). The song also appears on the 1968 album The Immortal Otis Redding. Redding's version reached No. 38 on the Billboard R&B chart and No. 51 on the pop chart.

The Black Crowes covered the song on their 1990 debut album Shake Your Money Maker; it would become their biggest hit single (#26 pop, #1 rock).

The Black Crowes version

American rock band the Black Crowes covered the song for their 1990 debut album, Shake Your Money Maker. Two versions of the song exist: the original album version and the hit single remixed with an overdubbed brass section. The album version was first released as a single in the United Kingdom in August 1990 and was issued in the United States later the same year.

The song peaked at number 45 on the US Hot 100, number one on Album Rock Tracks, and number 45 on the UK Singles Chart. Following the success of the band's first top-40 hit, "She Talks to Angels", the song re-entered the Hot 100 and peaked at number 26 in August 1991, becoming the Black Crowes' highest position on the chart. The same month, the song was re-released in the UK and reached a new peak of number 39.

Track listings

US 7-inch and cassette single (1990)
A. "Hard to Handle" (album version) – 3:08
B. "Waitin' Guilty" – 3:02

International 7-inch and cassette single (1990)
A. "Hard to Handle" (album version) – 3:06
B. "Jealous Again" (acoustic version) – 4:37

UK 12-inch single (1990)
A1. "Hard to Handle"
A2. "Jealous Again" (acoustic version)
B1. "Twice As Hard" (live at the Paradiso, June 5, 1990)
B2. "Stare It Cold" (live at the Paradiso, June 5, 1990)
 A 12-inch picture disc was also released, omitting "Stare It Cold".

UK CD single (1990)
 "Hard to Handle"
 "Jealous Again" (acoustic version)
 "Twice as Hard" (remix)

UK 7-inch single (1991)
A. "Hard to Handle" (album version)
B. "Sister Luck" (live at the Greek Theatre)

UK 7-inch picture disc (1991)
A. "Hard to Handle" (album version)
B. "Stare It Cold" (live at the Greek Theatre)

UK 12-inch single (1991)
A1. "Hard to Handle"
B1. "Dreams" (live at the Greek Theatre)
B2. "Stare It Cold" (live at the Greek Theatre)

UK CD single (1991)
 "Hard to Handle"
 "Sister Luck" (live at the Greek Theatre)
 "Stare It Cold" (live at the Greek Theatre)

Charts

Release history

Other versions
Sunshine Pop group, Harpers Bizarre covered the song in their unique style on their 1969 LP Harpers Bizarre 4
 Reggae artist Carl Dawkins recorded a cover, produced by Lee Perry in 1969 as a 7" A side
 Soul artist King Floyd covers this song on his 1973 studio album "Think About It" (Atco Records)
 Reggae artist Toots Hibbert covered the song on his 1988 album Toots in Memphis
 Reggae artist Capleton used the ascension / descension for "Wings of the Mourning" (remix) 1992 on the Def Jam label 
 Masta Ace samples this song's bass line for "Four Minus Three", a song from his debut album Take a Look Around
 The Lemon Jelly 2001 song "Rock", from a rare limited edition (1000 copies) single called "Soft/Rock" (which came in a pair of Levi's jeans with a condom in the pocket), features sampled elements of "Hard to Handle"
 The hip-hop producer Marley Marl sampled the five-note ascension and descension intro for his song "The Symphony" from his 1988 album In Control, Volume 1; it was re-sampled for Wreckx-N-Effect's 1992 song "Hard" and Snoop Dogg's 1999 song "Ghetto Symphony", from his album No Limit Top Dogg 
 Rapper Frankie Cutlass uses the five ascending notes on "The Cypher Pt III" from his 1997 album Politics & Bullsh*t
 German hip-hop band Fünf Sterne deluxe used the melody and samples in their 1998 song "Willst du mit mir gehn"
 The Grateful Dead performed the song on occasion in the late 1960s and early 1970s, typically sung by keyboardist Ron "Pigpen" McKernan; it appears on the Grateful Dead live albums History of the Grateful Dead, Volume One (Bear's Choice), Fallout from the Phil Zone, Ladies and Gentlemen... the Grateful Dead, Dick's Picks Volume 35, Dave's Picks Volume 6, Dave's Picks Volume 10, Dave's Picks Volume 19, and Dave's Picks Volume 30
 Serbian hard rock band Cactus Jack included a cover of the Black Crowes version on their 2002 live album DisCover
 Gov't Mule covered the song for their 2007 album Mighty High; they fused blues and reggae to produce this dub-style cover
 Mae West, as Leticia Van Allen, sings the song in the 1970 film Myra Breckenridge 
 British R&B/rock band Snafu included the song on their 1975 album All Funked Up and performed it for John Peel on his show of 4 September 1975
 The Blues Brothers did the song in Blues Brothers Belushi Birthday Bash at the House of Blues https://m.youtube.com/watch?v=U0Z4ieBYO4w

References

1968 singles
1968 songs
1990 singles
American Recordings (record label) singles
Atco Records singles
The Black Crowes songs
Grateful Dead songs
Guy Sebastian songs
Otis Redding songs
Songs released posthumously
Songs written by Al Bell
Songs written by Allen Jones (record producer)
Songs written by Otis Redding
Tony Joe White songs